Albert Walker may refer to:

Albert Johnson Walker (born 1946), identity thief and murderer from Canada
Albert Shield Walker (1846–1915), first mayor of Springfield, Oregon, U.S.
Albert Walker (footballer) (1910–1993), English footballer
Albert Walker (Ontario politician) (1910–1986), Canadian politician
Albert R. Walker (1881–1958), American architect
Rube Walker (Albert Bluford Walker, 1926–1992), American baseball player

See also
Bert Walker (disambiguation)
Albert (disambiguation)
Walker (disambiguation)
Walker (surname)